Leslie Arthur Logan AM (28 January 1908 – 15 December 2000) was an Australian politician who was a Country Party member of the Legislative Assembly of Western Australia from 1947 to 1974. He served as a minister in the government of Sir David Brand.

Logan was born in Geraldton, Western Australia, to Laura (née Eaton) and Alan Logan. He was raised on a small farm near Northampton, and after leaving school worked for a few years in Geraldton before returning to take over the farm. He was prominent in local agricultural circles, and also served on the Northampton Road Board from 1940 to 1945. Logan entered parliament at a 1947 Legislative Council by-election for Central Province, caused by the resignation of Edmund Hall. He was re-elected in 1948, and following a redistribution in 1950 was appointed to the new Midland Province, which covered the same area. Logan was re-elected again in 1954, and in 1957 was made Country Party whip in the Legislative Council.

Following the 1959 state election, which saw the formation of a Liberal–Country coalition government, Logan was appointed Minister for Local Government, Minister for Town Planning, and Minister for Child Protection in the new ministry formed by David Brand. He held his positions until the government's defeat at the 1971 election, a period of almost 12 years. At the 1965 election, Logan had transferred to the new two-member Upper West Province, which he held until his retirement at the 1974 election. He was made a Member of the Order of Australia (AM) in 1980, "for service to parliament and to the community". After leaving politics, Logan retired to Geraldton, dying there in December 2000 (aged 92). He had married Edgarina Bond in 1931, with whom he had four daughters.

References

1908 births
2000 deaths
Members of the Order of Australia
Members of the Western Australian Legislative Council
National Party of Australia members of the Parliament of Western Australia
People from Geraldton
Western Australian local councillors
20th-century Australian politicians